Stefano Pondaco (born May 4, 1989 in Vibo Valentia) is an Italian professional football player currently playing for Serie D club SCD Ligorna 1922.

Career

Ligorna 1922
Ahead of the 2019-20 season, Pondaco joined Serie D club SCD Ligorna 1922.

References

External links
 

1989 births
Living people
Italian footballers
S.S.D. Lucchese 1905 players
Virtus Entella players
Mantova 1911 players
U.S.D. Sestri Levante 1919 players
Serie C players
Serie D players
Association football midfielders